William Martin O'Connor or Bill O'Connor is a former basketball coach at Rockhurst University

Early life
William Martin O'Connor was born on January 13, 1950, in Kansas City, Missouri,  to John Joseph O'Connor and Martha Fetters O'Connor. Bill attended Rockhurst High School where he played varsity basketball. He continued to play at Benedictine College in Atchison, Kansas.

Career 
O'Connor started his career at Colby Community College as an assistant coach. He later was hired as an assistant coach at University of Texas-Pan American where he stayed for a short time before finding Rockhurst. In 1994 Bill was named head coach of the Rockhurst team, and led Rockhurst to multiple Great Lakes Valley Conference and Heartland Conference champions. He was named coach of the year multiple times in both the GLVC and the Heartland conference. O'Connor retired in 2015 as the winningest head coach in Rockhurst basketball history. He was inducted into the Greater Kansas City Basketball Coaches Association Hall of Fame on April 11, 2019.

Personal details 
He lives in Kansas City, Missouri, with his wife Elaine. He has 4 children, Tricia, Chris, Anna, and Caitlin.

References
https://rockhursthawks.com/coaches.aspx?rc=13
https://www.kansascity.com/sports/college/article10147853.html
https://quhawks.com/news/2014/9/19/MBB_0919142613.aspx
https://drurypanthers.com/news/2009/3/5/MBB_0305094502.aspx
https://www.whig.com/article/20081205/ARTICLE/312059990
https://wusports.com/news/2012/11/19/MBB_1119121154.aspx

1950 births
Living people
American men's basketball coaches
Basketball coaches from Missouri
Basketball players from Kansas City, Missouri
Benedictine Ravens men's basketball players
College men's basketball head coaches in the United States
High school basketball coaches in the United States
Junior college men's basketball coaches in the United States
Rockhurst Hawks men's basketball coaches
Sportspeople from Kansas City, Missouri
UT Rio Grande Valley Vaqueros men's basketball coaches